Szentmihály is the Hungarian name for three places in Romania:

 Mihai Viteazu Commune, Cluj County
 Mihăileni Commune, Harghita County (colloquial)
 Sânmihai de Pădure village, Beica de Jos Commune, Mureș County

It is also the name of a former village in Hungary, merged into the present day town of Tiszavasvári